Sergio Bernabé Vargas Buscalia (born 17 August 1965 in Chacabuco, Buenos Aires) is an Argentine born Chilean naturalised football manager and former football goalkeeper. He received ten caps for the Chile national team during his career. Vargas retired in 2005.

Club career
Vargas began his career in Independiente. After three seasons at the club with 98 appearances, he left for Club Sport Emelec of Ecuador. However Vargas left after a season to join Universidad de Chile.

Vargas, with other players such as Luis Musrri, Rogelio Delgado, Esteban Valencia, Marcelo Salas and Rodrigo Goldberg, helped Universidad de Chile to win the Primera División de Chile in 1994 and again in 1995. Before 1994, Universidad de Chile last won the championship in 1969.

Vargas will continue to win the Copa Chile in 1998 with Universidad de Chile. In 2000, he won the double with Universidad de Chile, winning both the Primera División de Chile and Copa Chile.

Vargas earned the nickname "Superman" for his constant saves in the air, especially in the last few moments.

Vargas then left for Unión Española where he stayed for as season. He then went to PSM Makassar in Indonesia. After two seasons, Vargas retired from soccer in 2005.

Recently entitled football coach, after a brief passage as technical manager at Universidad de Chile.

International career
Vargas was summoned for selection by Argentina U17 team but played for Chile in  2002 FIFA World Cup qualifiers.

Vargas made his debut match against Uruguay on 24 April 2001, which Chile lost 0–1 to an own goal.

He was also capped for the 2001 Copa América, playing four matches as Chile were knocked out in the quarterfinals.

Managerial career
In 2010, Vargas began his coaching career with Sportverein Jugendland Fussball in the Chilean Tercera B. The next year, he moved to Deportes Temuco in the Tercera A. 

In 2014, he coached Curicó Unido in the Primera B and, in 2015, he coached Trasandino in the Segunda División Profesional.

In addition, Vargas has worked as Sports Director of Universidad de Chile on two steps: from 2006 to 2007 and from 2019 to 2021 alongside Rodrigo Goldberg.

In January 2023, he assumed as Sport Manager of Barnechea.

Personal life
His son, Emanuel, has been a professional footballer who played as a goalkeeper.

After his retirement, Vargas has worked as a football commentator and analyst in different TV and radio media, such as Canal del Fútbol, Mega, Chilevisión, Fox Sports Chile and ADN Radio Chile. In addition, he has worked for the newspaper La Tercera.

Honours

Club
Independiente
 Copa Libertadores (1): 1984
 Intercontinental Cup (1): 1984
 Argentine Primera División (1): 1988–89

Universidad de Chile
 Primera División de Chile (4): 1994, 1995, 1999, 2000
 Copa Chile (2): 1998, 2000

References

External links

Sergio Vargas at CeroaCero (in Spanish)

1965 births
Living people
Sportspeople from Buenos Aires Province
Argentine emigrants to Chile
Argentine footballers
Naturalized citizens of Chile
Chilean footballers
Chile international footballers
Association football goalkeepers
Club Atlético Independiente footballers
C.S. Emelec footballers
Universidad de Chile footballers
Unión Española footballers
PSM Makassar players
Argentine Primera División players
Ecuadorian Serie A players
Chilean Primera División players
2001 Copa América players
Argentine expatriate footballers
Chilean expatriate footballers
Argentine expatriate sportspeople in Ecuador
Argentine expatriate sportspeople in Chile
Expatriate footballers in Ecuador
Expatriate footballers in Chile
Chilean expatriate sportspeople in Indonesia
Expatriate footballers in Indonesia
Chilean football managers
Deportes Temuco managers
Curicó Unido managers
Primera B de Chile managers
Canal del Fútbol color commentators
Chilevisión color commentators
Chilean association football commentators
Chilean radio personalities